Wishart may refer to:

People

Surname
 Adam Wishart (b. 1969), British documentary filmmaker
 Arthur Wishart (1903–1986), Canadian politician
 Betty Rose Wishart (born 1947), American composer and pianist
 Bobby Wishart (1933–2020), Scottish footballer
 Bridget Wishart (b. 1962), English vocalist, musician, and performance artist  
 Charles F. Wishart (1870–1960), American Presbyterian clergyman
 Craig Wishart (b. 1974), Zimbabwean cricketer
 Eunice Wishart (1898–1982), Canadian politician in Ontario
 Felicity Wishart (1965–2015), Australian conservationist and environmental activist
 Fraser Wishart (b. 1965), Scottish footballer (soccer player) and commentator
 George Wishart (c. 1513–1546), Scottish religious reformer and Protestant martyr
 Gordon Wishart (b. 1960), British surgeon
 Hugh Wishart (fl. 1793-1824), American silversmith
 Ian Wishart (disambiguation), various people
 James Wishart (1659–1723), British admiral and politician
 Jock Wishart (b. ? ), Scottish maritime and polar adventurer, sportsman, and explorer
 John Wishart (disambiguation), more than one person
 Kenneth Wishart (1908–1972), Guyanese cricketer
 Maria Torrence Wishart (1893 – 1982), Canadian medical illustrator and the founder of the University of Toronto's Art as Applied to Medicine program
 Michael Wishart (1928–1996), English painter
 Pete Wishart (b. 1962), Scottish politician
 Peter Wishart (composer) (1921–1984), English composer
 Robert Wishart (?–1316), Scottish bishop
 Rod Wishart (b. 1968), Australian rugby league player
 Spencer Wishart (1889–1914), American race car driver
 Stevie Wishart (b. ? ), English composer and musician
 Trevor Wishart (b 1946), English composer
 Ty Wishart (b. 1988), Canadian ice hockey player
 William Wishart (disambiguation), more than one person

Given name
 Wishart Bryan Bell (b. 1948), American choral conductor, pianist, music educator, and musicologist
 Wishart McLea Robertson (1891–1967), Canadian politician in Nova Scotia
 Wishart Spence (1904–1998), Canadian lawyer and jurist

Places

Antarctica
 Mount Wishart, a mountain in the Prince Charles Mountains

Australia
 Wishart, Northern Territory, a suburb
 Wishart, Queensland, a suburb of Brisbane

Canada
 Wishart, Saskatchewan, a hamlet
 Wishart Island, an island in Nunavut
 Wishart Island (British Columbia)
 Wishart Peninsula on the British Columbia Coast

United States
 Wishart, Missouri, an unincorporated community
 Wishart, Virginia, an unincorporated community in Accomack County, Virginia

Other
 Wishart baronets, a title in the Baronetage of Nova Scotia
 Wishart distribution, in statistics, a generalization to multiple dimensions of the chi-squared distribution or the gamma distribution
 Lawrence and Wishart, British publishers, successors to Wishart Ltd.
 , a British destroyer in commission in the Royal Navy from 1920 to 1945

Scottish surnames